Placebo Effect is an original novel written by Gary Russell and based on the long-running British science fiction television series Doctor Who. It features the Eighth Doctor and Sam and includes brief appearances by the characters of Stacy and Ssard, created by Russell for the Radio Times Doctor Who comic strip.

The novel features brief appearances by both the Foamasi, originally featured in The Leisure Hive, and the Wirrn, originally featured in The Ark in Space.

Plot
The Doctor takes Sam to Micawber's World, an artificial planet owned by the Carrington Corporation, to attend the wedding of his friends Stacy Townsend and the Ice Warrior Ssard. Sam is slightly peeved to learn that they travelled with him during the three-year period in which he'd left her at a one-hour Greenpeace rally, but she eventually forgives him. The wedding ceremony is disrupted by followers of the Church of the Way Forward, who believe that interspecies marriage dilutes racial purity and is thus forbidden by their Goddess. Chase Carrington himself apologises for the disruption and pays for the wedding guests’ expenses out of his own pocket. Later, however, he is murdered by Foamasi assassins working for the Dark Peaks Lodge, and an impersonator in a body-suit disguise takes his place...

Micawber's World is hosting the 3999 Olympics, and Ms Sox, the head of security for Carrington Corp, has called in extra Space Security troops for the occasion. A patrol vanishes while lighting the tunnels beneath the surface of the planet, but rather than court-martial Sergeant Dallion for losing her men without an explanation, Commander Ritchie gives her and the remaining members of her squad leeway to investigate. In fact, Ritchie's wife and son have been kidnapped by the Dark Peaks Lodge, who intend to discover what's going on in the tunnels and then kill Dallion.

Rivalry between Dark Peaks and the Twin Suns Lodge leads to the murder of a Foamasi, and when the Doctor notices the body being taken to the Space Security building for an autopsy, he involves himself in the investigation out of curiosity. Ritchie decides that the Doctor might prove to be a useful loose cannon and directs him to the Foamasi ambassador, Green Fingers. The Doctor also speaks with Ms Sox and with Sergeant Dallion, and eventually they all put together their stories and determine that the Dark Peaks Lodge is attempting to infiltrate Carrington Corp through blackmail, murder and impersonation.

Sam investigates the Church of the Way Forward but determines that they're not connected to the mystery; the telepathic Reverend Lukas simply wants to spread the word of his Goddess throughout the galaxy. His young follower Kyle Dale, who has come to compete in the Olympics, becomes intrigued by Sam's intelligent and passionate defense of her own beliefs. After leaving the Church followers, Sam happens across the entourage of the visiting Duchess of Auckland, just as the sycophantic journalist Talon Chalfont learns that he's been snubbed from the Duchess’ itinerary. Chalfont hacks into the Federation computers to search for a better story, learns of the missing troopers and sets off to investigate. Sam follows him, and Kyle, who happens to be passing by, follows them both.

Ms Sox informs the Doctor that her security team has been investigating SSS xenobiologist Miles Mason, who was seen consorting with an unknown alien shortly before arriving on Micawber's World. Ms Sox believes that Mason is involved with drug smugglers who have set up camp in the tunnels; it would seem that the Dark Peaks Lodge learned of her investigation while infiltrating Carrington Corp, and are attempting to find out what's going on so they can get in on the action. But Dark Peaks agents learn of the investigation and send word to Events Co-ordinator Sumner that Ritchie and his associates are conspiring to assassinate the Duchess of Auckland.

What nobody yet realizes is that the creatures in the tunnels are Wirrrn. Dr Mason has been absorbed into the Wirrrn hive mind, and has been using the facilities of the SSS labs to manufacture a mutagenic drug which will transform anyone who takes it into a Wirrrn. He intends to trick the Foamasi into distributing the drugs to the athletes under the impression that they are performance-enhancing; in fact most of them are placebos with the mutagenic tags attached. Some of the drugs contain a time-release formula, so those who take them will not fully transform into a Wirrrn for months, thus spreading the taint throughout the galaxy...

The missing patrol members have been transformed into Wirrrn larvae, and the Queen sends them to the surface to await the start of the games. She sends a telepathic message to Mason, ordering him to arrange a distraction that will provide the larvae with cover for their attack. The signal is also picked up by the Doctor, who faints dead away just as Sumner arrives to arrest the “conspirators”—and by Reverend Lukas, who believes it to be the call of his Goddess, and who leads his followers into the tunnels where most are absorbed by the Wirrrn. Chalfont is also transformed into a Wirrrn, but Sam and Kyle manage to escape.

Sumner realizes he's been deceived, and the recovering Doctor realizes that there's more going on in the tunnels than he'd previously believed. Green Fingers informs the other Lodges about Dark Peaks’ activities and executes the Dark Peaks Patriarch; the remaining Dark Peaks Foamasi are targeted and killed by assassins from the other Lodges, and eventually Ritchie's wife and son are found and rescued. In the process, it becomes clear that many Dark Peaks agents have themselves become infected by the Wirrrn in the course of their criminal activities. The Doctor and Ms Sox obtain a sample of the drugs, analyse them and learn the truth just as Sam and Kyle arrive with their story.

Mason plants a bomb beneath the Duchess of Auckland's podium, and she is killed instantly in the explosion. In the ensuing confusion the Wirrrn larvae emerge and attack, and some of the Olympic athletes spontaneously transform into Wirrrn, spreading confusion and terror. But thanks to their advance warning of the danger, SSS troops are able to contain the attack and drive off the larvae. The Doctor enters the tunnels and confronts the Wirrrn Queen, who has made her nest around the planet's artificial power source; he is able to rewire it and electrocute her, but some of the Wirrrn larvae survive. Acting on instinct, they steal a shuttle and set off back “home”, to the Andromeda Galaxy.

The Doctor synthesizes an antidote to the mutagenic drug, saving the athletes who took them from becoming Wirrrn—although they will never fully recover. Kyle decides to remain on Micawber's World and carry on the good work of the Church despite Lukas’ betrayal of his ideals. Lukas himself has escaped with the body of the Wirrrn Queen and with two of his followers—who are slowly transforming into Wirrrn themselves, ready to spread the word of their Goddess throughout the galaxy...

Continuity
Though Wirrn was spelled with only two r's in the original script for The Ark in Space, Ian Marter chose to add another “r” to their name when writing the novelisation, and that spelling is used throughout Placebo Effect.

External links

1998 British novels
1998 science fiction novels
Eighth Doctor Adventures
Novels by Gary Russell